Torsby Ski Tunnel is Sweden's first ski tunnel, located in Torsby, Sweden and was at the time of construction the world's longest ski tunnel. The tunnel was inaugurated on 16 June 2006 and is 1.3 km long, 8 m wide and 4 m high. Construction began in April 2005 and the total cost was just over 61 million SEK.

References

External links

Sports venues in Sweden
Buildings and structures in Värmland County
Sports venues completed in 2006
2006 establishments in Sweden